The F-14's Central Air Data Computer, also abbreviated as CADC, computes altitude, vertical speed, air speed, and mach number from sensor inputs such as pitot and static pressure and temperature. Earlier air data computer systems were electromechanical computers, such as in the F-111. From 1968 to 1970, the first CADC to use custom digital integrated circuits was developed for the F-14.

History

The CADC was a multi-chip integrated flight control system developed by Garrett AiResearch and used in early versions of the US Navy's F-14 Tomcat fighter. It is notable for early use of MOS custom integrated circuits and has been claimed as the first microprocessor. The first microprocessor existing on a single chip was the contemporary Intel 4004. However, the 4004 did not have nearly the computing power or interfacing capability required to perform the functions of the CADC; at the time, the best integrated circuit (chip) technology available lacked the scale (number of transistors per chip) necessary to build a single-chip microprocessor for a flight control system.

The CADC was designed and built by a team led by Steve Geller and Ray Holt, and supported by the startup American Microsystems. Design work started in 1968 and was completed in June 1970, beating out a number of electromechanical systems that had also been designed for the F-14.  It was classified by the Navy until 1998.  Ray Holt's story of this design and development is presented in his autobiography The Accidental Engineer.

The CADC consisted of an A-to-D converter, several quartz pressure sensors, and a number of MOS-based microchips. Inputs to the system included the primary flight controls, a number of switches, static and dynamic air pressure (for calculating stall points and aircraft speed) and a temperature gauge. The outputs controlled the primary flight controls, wing sweep, the F-14's leading edge "glove vane", and the flaps.

The MP944 ran at 375 kHz. It contained six chips used to build the CADC, all based on a 20-bit fixed-point-fraction two's complement number system. They were the parallel multiplier unit (PMU) in a 28-pin DIP, the parallel divider unit (PDU) (28-pin DIP), the random-access storage (RAS) (14-pin DIP), the read-only memory (ROM) (14-pin DIP), the special logic function (SLF) (28-pin DIP), and the steering logic unit (SLU) (28-pin DIP). The complete system of 28 circuits consists of 1 PMU, 1 PDU, 1 SLF, 3 RASs, 3 SLUs, and 19 ROMs, enabled by 74,442 transistors.

In 1971, Holt wrote an article about the system for Computer Design magazine, but the Navy classified it, and finally released it in 1998.  For this reason, the CADC and MP944 remain fairly obscure in spite of their historical importance.

References

Further reading 

 https://www.wired.com/story/secret-history-of-the-first-microprocessor-f-14/

External links
 First Microprocessor

Avionics computers
Computer-related introductions in 1970
Flight control systems
Military computers